gtkpod provides a graphical user interface that enables users of Linux and other Unix operating systems to transfer audio files onto their iPod Classic, iPod Nano, iPod Shuffle, iPod Photo, or iPod Mini music players. Although it does not support some of the more advanced features of iTunes, gtkpod still performs the role of an iPod manager for Linux. Album art and videos are now supported, and preliminary support for jailbroken iPhones and iPod Touches is available.

Most digital audio players permit the user to browse and access their content via an interface closely related to the underlying file system. iPods, on the other hand, employ a proprietary database file for managing all the metadata associated with their content. Because of this, an iPod cannot recognize files that have been copied directly into the low-level file system unless its music database has been appropriately modified. This task is usually performed by iTunes, but since Apple has only released versions for Mac OS X and Windows, gtkpod provides the needed support for other operating systems.

Starting with version 0.93, the code that handles the iPod access has been separated as libgpod, a shared library that allows other projects to provide iPod support as well. It is currently used by popular players such as Rhythmbox and Amarok.

See also

Comparison of iPod managers
Comparison of media players
List of free software for audio
List of Linux audio software

References

External links

Supported iPods

Free audio software
Free software programmed in C
IPod software
Audio software that uses GTK
Linux audio video-related software
IOS software